Mahabad Dam is an embankment dam on the Mahabad River near the city of Mahabad, West Azerbaijan province, Iran. It was built before the Islamic revolution by Yugoslavian engineers and is one of the ten largest dams in Iran. On average, the total volume of annual water input is equal to 339.304  million cubic meters. The dam also has a hydroelectric power station. Construction began in 1968 and the dam was completed in 1970.

Mahabad–Sardasht Road and Mahabad-Piranshahr Road pass along this beautiful lake. Scenic areas around the lake include the islands Qazîabad, Serî Meydan and Taqeda (single tree). The lake is a perfect place for swimming and fishing. Fishes such as carp and perch from the lake can be noted.

References

External links

Mahabad
Dams in West Azerbaijan Province
Hydroelectric power stations in Iran
Embankment dams
Dams completed in 1970
Energy infrastructure completed in 1972